Lasse-Maja is a 1941 Swedish historical comedy film directed by Gunnar Olsson and starring Sture Lagerwall, Liane Linden and Emil Fjellström. It also marked the screen debut of actress Mai Zetterling. It was shot at the Sundbyberg Studios in Stockholm. The film's sets were designed by the art director Max Linder. It is based on the career of the nineteenth century thief Lasse-Maja.

Cast
 Sture Lagerwall as 	Lars Molin
 Liane Linden as Lena Andersdotter
 Emil Fjellström as 	Silver-Jan
 John Ekman as Niklas Halling
 Hugo Jacobsson as 	Linus
 Wiktor Andersson as 	Petter 
 Arthur Natorp as 	Anders i Lilltorpet
 Rune Carlsten as 	Krusenhielm
 Hjördis Petterson as 	Madame Agathe 
 Margit Manstad as 	Liselotte
 Carl Barcklind as 	Ehrenstolphe
 Karl-Magnus Thulstrup as King Karl XIV Johan
 Kerstin Berger as Emilie
 Jeanette Von Heidenstam a s	Anne-Sofie
 Mai Zetterling as 	Fanny 
 Willy Peters as 	Alphonse
 Georg Årlin as 	Priest 
 Anders Frithiof as 	Judge
 Hugo Björne as 	Place-Major Ehrenstolpe
 Olov Wigren as Adjutant 
 Gustaf Hjärne as Prison guard 
 Torsten Winge as Police Chief
 Gideon Wahlberg as 	Inn Keeper
 Nils Ohlin as The King's Marshall
 Emmy Albiin as 	Blind mother Britta in Vingåker 
 Albert Ståhl as 	Zachrisson, fencer
 Per-Axel Arosenius as 	Man at the inn 
 Helga Brofeldt as 	Guest at baron Krusenhielm's party 
 David Erikson as 	Priest at baron Krusenhielm's party
 Erik Forslund as 	Prisoner 
 Sven-Eric Gamble as Son of man in rowing boat
 Ernst Brunman as 	Inn keeper 
 Agda Helin as Inn keeper 
 Arne Lindblad as 	Customs guard 
 Uno Larsson as 	Soldier 
 Helge Karlsson as 	Ola i Backa 
 Artur Cederborgh as 	Cook at the jail 
 Gösta Grip as 	Lieutenant outside prison in Örebro 
 Curt Masreliez as 	Young man at the opera 
 Julia Cæsar as 	Woman

References

Bibliography 
 Krawc, Alfred. International Directory of Cinematographers, Set- and Costume Designers in Film: Denmark, Finland, Norway, Sweden (from the beginnings to 1984). Saur, 1986.

External links 
 

1941 films
1941 comedy films
1940s Swedish-language films
Films directed by Gunnar Olsson
Swedish historical comedy films
1940s historical comedy films
Films set in the 19th century
1940s Swedish films